DWSR (94.1 FM), broadcasting as 94.1 Power Radio, is a radio station owned and operated by Caceres Broadcasting Corporation. Its studios and transmitter are located at Door 3, San Ramon Bldg., Happy Homes Subd. Phase 3, Brgy. Magang, Daet.

References

Radio stations established in 2010
Radio stations in Camarines Norte